The body louse (Pediculus humanus humanus, also known as Pediculus humanus corporis) is a hematophagic ectoparasite louse that infests humans. It is one of three  lice which infest humans, the other two being the head louse, and the crab louse or pubic louse.

Despite the name, body lice do not directly live on the host. They lay their eggs on fibres of clothing and only come into contact with the host whenever they need to feed. Since body lice cannot jump or fly, they spread by direct contact with another person or more rarely by contact with clothing or bed sheets that are infested.

Body lice are disease vectors and can transmit pathogens that cause human diseases such as epidemic typhus, trench fever, and relapsing fever. In developed countries, infestations are only a problem in areas of poverty where there is poor body hygiene, crowded living conditions, and a lack of access to clean clothing. Outbreaks can also occur in situations where large groups of people are forced to live in unsanitary conditions. These types of outbreaks are seen globally in prisons, homeless populations, refugees of war, or when natural disasters occur and proper sanitation is not available.

Life cycle and morphology
Pediculus humanus humanus (the body louse) is indistinguishable in appearance from Pediculus humanus capitis (the head louse), and the two subspecies will interbreed under laboratory conditions. In their natural state, however, they occupy different habitats and do not usually meet. They can feed up to five times a day and as adults can live for about thirty days, but if they are separated from their host they will die within a week. If the conditions are favorable, the body louse can reproduce rapidly. After the final molt, female and male lice will mate immediately. A female louse can lay up to 200–300 eggs during her lifetime.

The life cycle of the body louse consists of three stages: egg, nymph, and adult.

 Eggs (also called nits, see head louse nits) are attached to the clothes by the female louse, using a secretion of the accessory glands that holds the egg in place until it hatches, while the nits (empty egg shells) may remain for months on the clothing. They are oval and usually yellow to white in color and at optimal temperature and humidity, the new lice will hatch from the egg within 6 to 9 days after being laid.
 A nymph is an immature louse that hatches from the egg. Immediately after hatching it starts feeding on the host's blood and then returns to the clothing until the next blood-meal. The nymph will molt three times before the adult louse emerges. The nymph usually takes 9–12 days to develop into an adult louse.
 The adult body louse is about 2.5–3.5 mm long, and like a nymph it has six legs. It is wingless and is tan to grayish-white in color.

The two  P. humanus subspecies are morphologically quite identical. Their heads are short with two antennae that are split into five segments each, compacted thorax, seven segmented abdomen with lateral paratergal plates.

Origins
The body louse diverged from the head louse around 170,000 years ago, establishing the latest date for the adoption of clothing by humans. Body lice were first described by Carl Linnaeus in the 10th edition of Systema Naturae. The human body louse had its genome sequenced in 2010, and at that time it had the smallest known insect genome. 
The body louse belongs to the phylum Arthropoda, class Insecta, order Phthiraptera and family Pediculidae. There are roughly 5,000 species of lice described, 4,000 are parasitizing birds, while additional 800 are special parasites of mammals worldwide.

Signs and symptoms 
Since an infestation can include thousands of lice, with each of them biting five times a day, the bites can cause strong itching, especially at the beginning of the infestation, that can result in skin excoriations and secondary infections. If an individual is exposed to a long-term infestation, he or she may experience apathy, lethargy and fatigue.

Treatment 
In principle, body louse infestations can be controlled by periodically changing clothes and bedding. Thereafter, clothes, towels, and bedding should be washed in hot water (at least ) and dried using a hot cycle. The itching can be treated with topical and systemic corticosteroids and antihistamines. In case of secondary infections, antibiotics can be used to control the bacterial infection. When regular changing of clothes and bedding is not possible, the infested items could be treated with insecticides.

Diseases caused 

Unlike other species of lice, body lice can also act as vectors of disease. The most important pathogens which are transmitted by them are Rickettsia prowazekii (causes epidemic typhus), Borrelia recurrentis (causes relapsing fever), and Bartonella quintana (causes trench fever).

Epidemic typhus can be treated with one dose of doxycycline, but if left untreated, the fatality rate is 30%. Relapsing fever can be treated with tetracycline and depending on the severity of the disease, if left untreated it has a fatality rate between 10 and 40%. Trench fever can be treated with either doxycycline or gentamicin, if left untreated the fatality rate is less than 1%.

See also 
 List of parasites of humans

References

External links 
 Body and head lice on the UF/IFAS Featured Creatures Web Site

Ectoparasites
Insects described in 1758
Lice
Parasitic arthropods of humans
Taxa named by Carl Linnaeus